Setihercostomus is a genus of flies in the family Dolichopodidae, known from China, Taiwan, Russia and Tanzania.

The generic name is derived from the Greek prefix seti- and the generic name Hercostomus.

Species
There are currently five species in the genus:
Setihercostomus huangi (Zhang, Yang & Masunaga, 2004)
Setihercostomus scharffi (Grichanov, 1999)
Setihercostomus setifacies (Stackelberg, 1934)
Setihercostomus taiwanensis Zhang & Yang, 2011
Setihercostomus wuyangensis (Wei, 1997)

Setihercostomus zonalis (Yang, Yang & Li, 1998) is a synonym of S. wuyangensis (Wei, 1997).

References

Dolichopodinae
Dolichopodidae genera
Diptera of Asia
Diptera of Africa